The anis are the three species of birds in the genus Crotophaga of the cuckoo family. They are essentially tropical New World birds, although the range of two species just reaches the United States.

Unlike some cuckoos, the anis are not brood parasites, but nest communally, the cup nest being built by several pairs from 2–6 m high in a tree. A number of females lay their eggs in the nest and then share incubation and feeding.

The anis are large black birds with a long tail and a deep ridged black bill. Their flight is weak and wobbly, but they run well, and usually feed on the ground.

These are very gregarious species, always found in noisy groups. Anis feed on termites, large insects, and even lizards and frogs. The claim that they will remove ticks and other parasites from grazing animals has been disputed; while there is no doubt that anis follow grazing animals to catch disturbed insects and will occasionally eat fallen ticks, there is no proof that they remove ticks from the animals' bodies.

Taxonomy
The genus Crotophaga was introduced in 1758 by the Swedish naturalist Carl Linnaeus in the tenth edition of his Systema Naturae to accommodate a single species, the smooth-billed ani (Crotophaga ani). The genus name combines the Ancient Greek krotōn meaning "tick" with -phagos meaning "-eating". Linnaeus cited the Irish physician Patrick Browne who in 1756 in his The Civil and Natural History of Jamaica had used the name Crotophaga and remarked that smooth-billed anis "live chiefly upon ticks and other small vermin; and may be frequently seen jumping about all cows and oxen in the fields". The name "Ani" was used in 1648 by German naturalist Georg Marcgrave in his Historia Naturalis Brasiliae. Marcgrave did not explain the origin of the word, but it is probably derived from the Tupi language.

Species
The genus contains three species.

References

External links 

 
Extant Calabrian first appearances